Corte Madera may refer to any of several places in California, US:

 Corte Madera, California, an incorporated town in Marin County
 Arroyo Corte Madera del Presidio, a stream in Marin County
 Corte Madera Creek (Marin County, California)
 Corte Madera Creek (San Mateo County, California)